The Army Substance Abuse Program is an anti-substance abuse program in the United States Army, operated by the Army Center for Substance Abuse Programs.

The program is governed by AR 600-85, MEDCOM Reg 40-51, ALARACT 062/2011, DA Pam 600-85, and the Employee Assistance Program (EAP). Army policy states that the program is to be supported by a soldier's entire chain of command, including the commander.

Mission and objectives
The mission of the Army Center for Substance Abuse Programs (ACSAP) is to strengthen the overall fitness and effectiveness of the Army’s workforce, to conserve manpower, and to enhance the combat readiness of soldiers. The following are the objectives of the ACSAP:
 Increase individual fitness and overall unit readiness.
 Provide services which are proactive and responsive to the needs of the Army’s workforce and emphasize alcohol and other drug abuse deterrence, prevention, education, and rehabilitation.
 Implement alcohol and other drug risk reduction and prevention strategies that respond to potential problems before they jeopardize readiness, productivity, and careers.
 Restore to duty those substance-impaired soldiers who have the potential for continued military service.
 Provide effective alcohol and other drug abuse prevention and education at all levels of command, and encourage commanders to provide alcohol and drug-free leisure activities.
 Ensure all personnel assigned to ASAP staff are appropriately trained and experienced to accomplish their missions.
 Achieve maximum productivity and reduce absenteeism and attrition among civilian corps members by reducing the effects of the abuse of alcohol and other drugs.
 Improve readiness by extending services to the soldiers, civilian corps members, and family members.

Concept and principles
The ASAP is a command program that emphasizes readiness and personal responsibility. The ultimate decision regarding separation or retention of abusers is the responsibility of the Soldier’s chain of command. The command role in substance abuse prevention, drug and alcohol testing, early ID of problems, rehabilitation, and administrative or judicial actions is essential. Commanders will ensure that all officials and supervisors support the ASAP. Proposals to provide ASAP services that deviate from procedures prescribed by this regulation must be approved by the Director, ASAP. Deviations in clinical issues also require approval of the Commander, U.S. Army Medical Command (USAMEDCOM). In either case, approval must be obtained before establishing alternative plans for services (as required for isolated or remote areas or special organizational structures).

The two overarching tenets of the ASAP are Prevention and Treatment.

Eligibility criteria
The ASAP services are authorized for personnel who are eligible to receive military medical services or are eligible for medical services under the Federal Civilian Employees Occupational Health Services Program. In addition to soldiers, eligibility includes;

 United States (U.S.) citizen DOD civilian employees, to include both appropriated and non-appropriated fund employees.
 Foreign national employees where status of forces agreements or other treaty arrangements provide for medical services.
 Retired military personnel.
 Family members of eligible personnel when they are eligible for medical care under the provisions of AR 40–400, (paragraphs 3–14 through 3–16.)
 Members of the U.S. Navy, U.S. Marine Corps, U.S. Air Force, and U.S. Coast Guard when they are under the administrative jurisdiction of an Army commander who is subject to this regulation.
 Non-uniformed outside continental United States (OCONUS) personnel who are eligible to receive military medical services.

When soldiers are under the administrative jurisdiction of another Service, they will comply with the alcohol and other drug program of that Service. All drug test results and records of referrals for counseling and rehabilitation will be reported through Army alcohol and drug abuse channels to the ACSAP.

When elements of the Army and another Service are so located that cost effectiveness, efficiency, and combat readiness can be achieved by combining facilities, the Service to receive the support will be responsible for initiating a local Memorandum of Understanding and/or Interservice Support Agreement (refer to DODI 4000.19).

Members of the Army National Guard (ARNG) and United States Army Reserve (USAR) who are not on AD are eligible to use ASAP services on a space/resource available basis.

Similar Studies
A study to explore substance use and emotional distress in military members, from military to civilian life transition was conducted by Karen Derefinko. The study included multiple forms of substance use, including cigarettes, marijuana, illicit and prescription drug misuse. There was a disclaimer that there would be no repercussions for anything admitted in the study. 

All participants were voluntary and were recruited through word of mouth by an initial 5 veterans who were chosen by the staff members of the study. 

The eligibility requirements for this study was that the individuals had to serve for at least 12 months in an active duty branch and had to be separated from the military for at least 6 months. 80 veterans met the requirements and completed the survey.

The procedures of the study were simple, the veterans took a survey online, and were provided a gift card afterwards. 

The findings of substance use were "graded" using a system 1-5, 1 = never, 2 =  once a month or less, 3 = once a week, 4 = 2 to 3 times a week, and 5 = 4 to 5 times a week. The findings were separated between active duty use and use after separation. 

The active duty use of alcohol was 91.5%, the active duty use of cigarettes was 40.7%, the active duty use of marijuana was 3.7%, the active duty use of hard drugs was 4.9%, the active duty use of prescription drugs was 11.1%

The post separation use of alcohol was 88.6%, the post separation use of cigarettes was 37.5%, the post separation use of marijuana was 26.2%, the post separation use of hard drugs was 11.4%, and the post separation use of prescription drugs was 15%.

References

External links
 AR 600-85 
 The Army Substance Abuse Program Website 
 ALARACT 062/2011 
 DODI 4000.19 

United States Army projects
Psychoactive drugs and the military